Frej Larsson (born 9 September 1983 in Ronneby, Sweden) is a Swedish musician and rapper. He is a member of Slagsmålsklubben, Maskinen and Far & Son.

Frej Larsson joined Slagsmålsklubben in 2002, after he met them at the 2002 Emmabodafestivalen.

References

Swedish male musicians
Swedish-language singers
1983 births
Living people